Semur may refer to:

Geography
One of several communes in France:
 Bierre-lès-Semur, in the Côte-d'Or département
 Courcelles-lès-Semur, in the Côte-d'Or département
 Massingy-lès-Semur, in the Côte-d'Or département
 Semur-en-Auxois, in the Côte-d'Or département
 Semur-en-Brionnais, in the Saône-et-Loire département
 Semur-en-Vallon, in the Sarthe département

Cuisine
 Semur (Indonesian stew)

See also
Semu